The following is a list of Mozilla Foundation / Mozilla Corp. products. All products, unless specified, are cross-platform by design.

Client applications
 Firefox Browser - An open-source web browser.
 
 Firefox Focus - A privacy-focused mobile web browser.
 Firefox Reality - A web browser optimized for virtual reality.
 Firefox for Android (also Firefox Daylight) - A web browser for mobile phones and smaller non-PC devices.
 Firefox Monitor - An online service for alerting the user when their email addresses and passwords have been leaked in data breaches.
 Mozilla Thunderbird - An email and news client.
 Mozilla VPN - A virtual private network client.
 SeaMonkey (formerly Mozilla Application Suite) - An Internet suite.
 ChatZilla - The IRC component, also available as a Firefox extension.
 Mozilla Calendar - Originally planned to be a calendar component for the suite; became the base of Mozilla Sunbird.
 Mozilla Composer - The HTML editor component.
 Mozilla Mail & Newsgroups - The email and news component.

Components
 DOM Inspector - An inspector for DOM.
 Gecko - The layout engine.
 Necko - The network library.
 Rhino - The JavaScript engine written in Java programming language.
 Servo - A layout engine.
 SpiderMonkey - The JavaScript engine written in C programming language.
 Venkman - A JavaScript debugger.

Development tools
 Bugzilla - A bugtracker.
 Rust (programming language)
 Skywriter - An extensible and interoperable web-based framework for code editing.
 Treeherder - A detective tool that allows developers to manage software builds and to correlate build failures on various platforms and configurations with particular code changes (Predecessors: TBPL and Tinderbox).

API/Libraries
 Netscape Portable Runtime (NSPR) - A platform abstraction layer that makes operating systems appear the same.
 Network Security Services (NSS) - A set of libraries designed to support cross-platform development of security-enabled client and server applications.
 Network Security Services for Java (JSS) - A Java interface to NSS.
 Personal Security Manager (PSM) - A set of libraries that performs cryptographic operations on behalf of a client application.

Other tools
 Client Customization Kit (CCK) - A set of tools that helps distributors customize and distribute the client.
 Mozbot - An IRC bot written in Perl.
 Mozilla Directory SDK - For writing applications which access, manage, and update the information stored in an LDAP directory.
 Mozilla Raindrop - Was an upcoming technology for sending messages.
 Mstone - A multi-protocol stress and performance measurement tool.
 Thimble - Mozilla's web-based educational code editor, part of the company's "Webmakers" project (Thimble was shut down in December 2019 and its projects were migrated to Glitch).

Technologies
 JavaScript - The de facto client-side scripting programming language originated from Netscape Navigator.
 NPAPI - A plugin architecture originated from Netscape Navigator.
 XBL - A markup language for binding an XML element with its behavior(s).
 XPCOM - A software componentry model similar to COM.
 XPConnect - A binding between XPCOM and JavaScript.
 XPInstall - A technology for installing extensions.
 XTF - A framework for implementing new XML elements.
 XUL - A markup language for user interface.

Abandoned
 Bonsai - A web-based interface for the CVS.
 Camino - A web browser intended for Mac OS X.
 Classilla   - A web browser made for PowerPC-based classic Macintosh operating systems.
 ElectricalFire - A Java virtual machine using just-in-time compilation.
 Firefox Lockwise - A mobile application and integral part of Firefox Browser, for securely storing & syncing passwords.
 Firefox OS - An open source operating system for smartphones and tablet computers mainly based on HTML5.
 Firefox Send - A web-based file sharing platform with end-to-end encryption and a link that automatically expires.
 Mariner - The improved layout engine based on code of Netscape Communicator.
 Minimo - A web browser for handheld devices.
 Mozilla Grendel - A mail and news client written in Java programming language.
 Mozilla Persona - A decentralized authentication system for the web.
 Mozilla Sunbird - A calendar client.
 Xena ("Javagator") - A communicator suite rewritten in Java programming language.

References

External links
 The Mozilla.org Projects List

Mozilla
Mozilla
Mozilla